Trogoblemma is a genus of moths of the family Noctuidae. The genus was erected by George Hampson in 1910.

Species
Trogoblemma acutalis (Schaus, 1906) Brazil (São Paulo)
Trogoblemma cacodoxica Dyar, 1914 Mexico, Costa Rica
Trogoblemma lilacina Jones, 1915 Brazil (São Paulo)
Trogoblemma lucens Schaus, 1914 French Guiana
Trogoblemma modesta Schaus, 1911 Costa Rica
Trogoblemma sericata Schaus, 1914 French Guiana
Trogoblemma serralis Jones, 1915 Brazil (São Paulo)

References

Acontiinae